Vitiello is an Italian surname. Notable people with the surname include:

Cory Vitiello, Canadian restaurateur and celebrity chef
Francesco Vitiello (born 1981), Italian actor
Gennaro Vitiello (1929–1985), Italian stage actor and director
Joe Vitiello (born 1970), American baseball player
Leandro Vitiello (born 1985), Italian footballer
:it:Pasquale Vitiello (1912–1962), Italian painter 
Roberto Vitiello (born 1983), Italian footballer
Ronald Vitiello (born 1963), American law enforcement official
Sandro Vitiello (born 1958), American football player
Stephen Vitiello, American musician

Italian-language surnames